Parabolic usually refers to something in a shape of a parabola, but may also refer to a parable.

Parabolic may refer to:
In mathematics:
In elementary mathematics, especially elementary geometry:
Parabolic coordinates
Parabolic cylindrical coordinates
parabolic Möbius transformation
Parabolic geometry (disambiguation)
Parabolic spiral
Parabolic line
In advanced mathematics:
Parabolic cylinder function
Parabolic induction
Parabolic Lie algebra
Parabolic partial differential equation
In physics:
Parabolic trajectory
In technology:
Parabolic antenna
Parabolic microphone
Parabolic reflector
Parabolic trough - a type of solar thermal energy collector
Parabolic flight - a way of achieving weightlessness
Parabolic action, or parabolic bending curve - a term often used to refer to a progressive bending curve in fishing rods.
In commodities and stock markets:
Parabolic SAR - a chart pattern in which prices rise or fall with an increasingly steeper slope
Other
Parabolic dune, a sand formation